Kristina "Mulle" Kristiansen (born 13 July 1989) is a Danish handball player for Nykøbing Falster Håndboldklub and the Danish national team.

International honours 
Danish Championship:
Winner: 2017
Runner-up: 2013
EHF Cup:
Winner: 2013
Runner-up: 2011
World Championship:
Bronze Medalist: 2013
World Youth Championship:
Gold Medalist: 2006

Individual awards
Danish League Top Scorer: 2010, 2016
Danish League Best Centre Back: 2016
 All-Star Playmaker of the European Championship: 2014

References

External links

1989 births
Living people
Danish female handball players
People from Høje-Taastrup Municipality
Danish LGBT sportspeople
Danish lesbians
LGBT handball players
Lesbian sportswomen
Nykøbing Falster Håndboldklub players
Sportspeople from Region Zealand
Sportspeople from the Capital Region of Denmark